This is a list of children's rights organizations by country.

Organisations

See also
 Children's Ombudsman
 Children's rights movement
 Children's rights
 Odisha State Child Protection Society

References

Children's rights organizations